Heidi Musum (born 22 June 1993), better known by her stage name Kamferdrops, is a Norwegian singer and songwriter. She first achieved recognition in Sweden and Norway in 2017, after her cover of Ole Ivars and Kikki Danielsson's 1999 song "Jag trodde änglarna fanns" became a number-two hit in Sweden and top forty hit in Norway.

She is known for always wearing a mask while making public appearances, and her songs are sung in both Swedish and Norwegian. Kamferdrops competed in Melodifestivalen 2018 with the song "Solen lever kvar hos dig". She was eliminated after she placed sixth in the first semi-final.

Discography

Charted singles

References

1993 births
Living people
Masked musicians
Musicians from Oslo
Norwegian expatriates in Sweden
Norwegian pop singers
Norwegian songwriters
Swedish-language singers
21st-century Norwegian singers
21st-century Norwegian women singers
Melodifestivalen contestants of 2018